Maximum cardinality matching is a fundamental problem in graph theory.
We are given a graph , and the goal is to find a matching containing as many edges as possible; that is, a maximum cardinality subset of the edges such that each vertex is adjacent to at most one edge of the subset. As each edge will cover exactly two vertices, this problem is equivalent to the task of finding a matching that covers as many vertices as possible.

In this case, the problem can be efficiently solved with simpler algorithms than in the general case.

Algorithms for bipartite graphs

Flow-based algorithm 
The simplest way to compute a maximum cardinality matching is to follow the Ford–Fulkerson algorithm. This algorithm solves the more general problem of computing the maximum flow. A bipartite graph  can be converted to a flow network as follows.

 Assign a capacity of 1 to each edge. 

Since each edge in the network has integral capacity, there exists a maximum flow where all flows are integers; these integers must be either 0 or 1 since the all capacities are 1. Each integral flow defines a matching in which an edge is in the matching if and only if its flow is 1. It is a matching because:

Advanced algorithms 
An improvement to this algorithm is given by the more elaborate Hopcroft–Karp algorithm, which searches for multiple augmenting paths simultaneously. This algorithm runs in  time.

Using boolean operations on words of size  the complexity is further improved to

More efficient algorithms exist for special kinds of bipartite graphs:
 For planar bipartite graphs, the problem can be solved in time  where  is the number of vertices, by reducing the problem to maximum flow with multiple sources and sinks.

Algorithms for arbitrary graphs 

The blossom algorithm finds a maximum-cardinality matching in general (not necessarily bipartite) graphs. It runs in time . The same bound was achieved by an algorithm by Blum (de) and an algorithm by Gabow and Tarjan.

An alternative approach uses randomization and is based on the fast matrix multiplication algorithm. This gives a randomized algorithm for general graphs with complexity . This is better in theory for sufficiently dense graphs, but in practice the algorithm is slower.

Other algorithms for the task are reviewed by Duan and Pettie (see Table I). In terms of approximation algorithms, they also point out that the blossom algorithm and the algorithms by Micali and Vazirani can be seen as approximation algorithms running in linear time for any fixed error bound.

Applications and generalizations 

 By finding a maximum-cardinality matching, it is possible to decide whether there exists a perfect matching.
 The problem of finding a matching with maximum weight in a weighted graph is called the maximum weight matching problem, and its restriction to bipartite graphs is called the assignment problem. If each vertex can be matched to several vertices at once, then this is a generalized assignment problem.
 A priority matching is a particular maximum-cardinality matching in which prioritized vertices are matched first.
 The problem of finding a maximum-cardinality matching in a hypergraph is NP-complete even for 3-uniform hypergraphs.

References 

Matching (graph theory)